Union of Antifascist Women of Romania (Uniunea Femeilor Antifasciste din România) also known as the Union of Democratic Women of Romania (Uniunea Femeilor Democrate din România) and finally (in 1958-1989) as Women National Council (Consiliul Național al Femeilor), was a state women's organization in Communist Romania, founded in 1944.

It was a state organization and a branch of the Romanian Communist Party (PCR). 

Its purpose was to mobilise women in the political ideology of the state, as well as to enforce the party's policy within gender roles and women's rights. It played an important role in the life of women in the state during its existence.

References

 Marilyn Rueschemeyer, Women in the Politics of Postcommunist Eastern Europe
 Claudia-Florentina Dobre, Cristian Emilian Ghi: Quest for a Suitable Past: Myths and Memory in Central and Eastern Europe

Social history of Romania
Women's organizations based in Romania
Socialist Republic of Romania
History of women in Romania
Feminist organizations in Europe
Political organizations
Organizations established in 1944
1944 establishments in Romania
Organizations disestablished in 1989
1989 disestablishments in Romania